The Bombing of Bremen in World War II by the British Royal Air Force (RAF) and US Eighth Air Force involved both indiscriminate "area bombing" and, as capacity improved, more targeted raids upon the city's military-industrial facilities. These included, the shipyards of Vulkan, AG Weser and Atlas Werke, the Valentin submarine pens, oil refineries and the aircraft works of Focke-Wolf.

Early RAF raids on Bremen beginning in May 1940 had sought out these industrial and military targets but the efforts proved costly and, given limited navigation and target-location capabilities, impractical.

From September 1941 the RAF switched to night-time "area bombing". In the spring of 1942 new directives from Bomber Command under Air Marshal Arthur Harris formalised the change of strategy. Purporting to draw lessons from the German Blitz on Britain, Bomber Command concluded that rather than being "collateral damage", the destruction of residential districts and the killing of civilians served the legitimate purpose of weakening enemy morale.

To demonstrate the effectiveness of area bombing, Bomber Command sought to overwhelm city defences with "1,000 bomber" raids. The first of these mounted against Bremen was on 25 June 1942. Six hundred houses were destroyed but civil defence measures kept civilian casualties to 88. Flak and Luftwaffe fighters were able to shoot down 49 RAF bombers. Subsequent attacks were carried out by fewer but improved aircraft, and as Bremen's air-defence depleted (fighter aircraft were redeployed to the eastern front), these caused significantly more damage.

At the beginning of 1943, the day-time targeting of industrial and military  facilities returned with the arrival over Bremen of the 8th US Air Force. In the first year, the "Mighty Eighth" suffered considerable losses. The German authorities began to evacuate industrial facilities from the city as a precaution.

From 8 October 1943, the British began a new wave of heavy night attacks. The heaviest air raid of the entire war hit the city on the night of August 18–19, 1944. In just 34 minutes 274 aircraft dropped 1,120 tons of bombs over the densely built-up west of the city killing 1,059 people, destroying 8,248 residential buildings, and leaving 50,000 homeless.

The last Allied air raid hit Bremen on April 22, 1945. Advancing behind a ground barrage, the British 3rd Infantry Division under General Lashmer Whistler entered the city in late April 1945.

In just over five years, the Allies carried out a total of 173 air raids on Bremen, dropping 5,513 tons of explosive devices, killing more than 4,000 residents. In addition to the city center, almost 65,000 houses and apartments were destroyed, corresponding to around 62 percent of the city's residential accommodation. The west of Bremen with the districts of Walle and Gröpelingen was particularly hard hit.

Targets in Bremen during World War II
 Atlas Werke shipbuilding company
 Bremen-Oslebshausen railway station
 Bremer Vulkan shipyard
 DeSchiMAG (AG Weser) shipyard
 Focke-Wulf aircraft factory
 Borgward motor transport plants
 Korff AG oil refinery
 Norddeutsche Hütte AG steel mill
 Valentin submarine pens, - protective shelters built for building U-boats

In June 1942, Bremen was the target for the RAF's third "thousand bomber raid".

Timeline of bombing raids

References 

Bombing Of Bremen In World War Ii
World War II strategic bombing of Germany
Germany–United Kingdom military relations
Germany–United States military relations